70 Barnes High Street, also known as  the Rose House, is a Grade II listed house in Barnes, London SW13, which dates from the 17th century. It is now used by the Barnes Community Association as office accommodation.

References

External links

17th-century establishments in England
Barnes, London
Grade II listed buildings in the London Borough of Richmond upon Thames
Grade II listed houses in London
Houses in the London Borough of Richmond upon Thames